Mawangdui is an archaeological site located in Changsha, China. The site consists of two saddle-shaped hills and contained the tombs of three people from the Changsha Kingdom during the western Han dynasty (206 BC – 9 AD): the Chancellor Li Cang,  his wife Xin Zhui, and a male believed to have been their son.  The site was excavated from 1972 to 1974.  Most of the artifacts from Mawangdui are displayed at the Hunan Provincial Museum. It was called "King Ma's Mound" possibly because it was (erroneously) thought to be the tomb of Ma Yin (853–930), a ruler of the Chu kingdom during the Five Dynasties and Ten Kingdoms period. The original name might have been the similarly-sounding "saddle-shaped mound" (馬鞍堆  - mǎ ān duī).

Tombs and their occupants 

The tombs were made of large cypress planks. The outside of the tombs were layered with white clay and charcoal. White clay layering originated with Chu burials, while charcoal layering was practiced during the early western Han dynasty in the Changsha area. The tombs contained nested lacquered coffins, a Chu burial custom. The tombs also followed the burial practices dictated by Emperor Wen of Han, containing no jade or precious metals.

The eastern tomb, Tomb no. 1, contained the remains of a woman in her fifties (Lady Dai, personal name Xin Zhui).  Her mummified body was so well-preserved that researchers were able to perform an autopsy on her body, which showed that she probably died of a heart attack. Specifically, her diet was too rich in sugars and meats, and she suffered from arterial-coronary problems.  Buried with her were skeletons of various food-animals, jujubes, lotus soup, grains and a complete meal including soup, rice and meat skewers on a lacquer set.  Researchers found honeydew melon seeds in her stomach, implying consumption right before death. She outlived the occupants of the other two tombs.

Xin Zhui's tomb was by far the best preserved of the three.  A complete cosmetic set, lacquered pieces and finely woven silk garments with paintings are almost perfectly preserved.  Her coffins were painted according to Chu customs and beliefs, with whirling clouds interwoven with mystical animals and dragons.  The corpse was bound tightly in layers of silk cloth and covered with a wonderfully painted T-shaped tapestry depicting the netherworld, earth and heavens with Chinese mythological characters as well as Xin Zhui. There was also a silk painting showing a variety of exercises that researchers have called the forerunner of Tai ji.

The western tomb, Tomb no. 2, was the burial site of the first Marquis of Dai, Li Cang.  He died in 186 BC.  The Han dynasty had appointed Li Cang as the chancellor of the Kingdom of Changsha, an imperial fiefdom of Han. This tomb had been plundered several times by grave robbers.

Tomb 3 was directly south of Tomb 1, and contained the tomb of a man in his thirties who died in 168 BC.  The occupant is believed to have been a relative of Li Cang and his wife. This tomb contained a rich trove of military, medical, and astronomical manuscripts written on silk.

Artifacts

Tombs 1 and 2 

Highly regarded artifacts in particular were the lacquered wine-bowls and cosmetic boxes, which showcased the craftsmanship of the regional lacquerware industry.

Of the more famous artifacts from Mawangdui were its silk funeral banners; these T-shaped banners were draped on the coffin of Tomb 1.  The banners depicted the Chinese abstraction of the cosmos and the afterlife at the time of the western Han dynasty.  A silk banner of similar style and function were found in Tomb 3.

The T-shaped silk funeral banner in the tomb of the Marquise (Tomb 1) is called the "name banner" with the written name of the deceased replaced with a portrait.  We know the name because the tomb's original inventory is still intact, and this is what it is called on the inventory.  The Marquise was buried in four coffins; the silk banner drapes the innermost of the coffins.

On the T-shaped painted silk garment, the uppermost horizontal section of the T represents heaven.  The bottom of the vertical section of the T represents the underworld.  The middle (the top of the vertical) represents earth.  In heaven we can see Chinese deities such as Nuwa and Chang'e, as well as Daoist symbols such as cranes (representing immortality).  Between heaven and earth we can see heavenly messengers sent to bring Lady Dai to heaven.  Underneath this are Lady Dai's family offering sacrifices to help her journey to heaven.  Beneath them is the underworld, with two giant sea serpents intertwined.

The contents of Tomb 2 had been destroyed or removed by robbers.  An excavation report has been published in Chinese; there has not been an English printing yet.

Tomb 3 
Tomb 3 contained a silk name banner (similar to that of tomb 1) and three maps drawn on silk: a topographic map, a military map and a prefecture map. The maps display the Hunan, Guangdong and Guangxi region and depict the political boundary between the Han dynasty and Nanyue. At the time of discovery, these were the oldest maps yet discovered in China, until 1986 when Qin State maps dating to the 4th century BC were found.

Tomb 3 contained a wealth of classical texts. The tomb contained texts on astronomy, which accurately depicted the planetary orbits for Venus, Jupiter, Mercury, Mars and Saturn and described various comets.  The Mawangdui texts of the Yijing are hundreds of years earlier than those known before, and have been translated by Edward Shaughnessy. The tomb also contained a rich collection of Huang-Lao Taoist texts, as well a copy of the Zhan Guo Ce.  The tomb also contained various medical texts, including depictions of tao yin (qigong) exercises, as well as a historical text, the Chunqiu shiyu.

See also 
 Book of Silk
 Mawangdui Silk Texts
 Changsha Kingdom
 Tomb of Marquis Yi of Zeng
 List of Chinese cultural relics forbidden to be exhibited abroad
 Han dynasty tomb architecture

References

Citations

Sources 
 Books
 Lee, Sherman E., 1994, A History of Far Eastern Art, Fifth edition, Prentice Hall
 

 Journal articles
 Buck, David D., 1975, Three Han Dynasty Tombs at Ma-Wang-Tui. World Archaeology, 7(1): 30-45.
 Hsu, Mei-Ling, 1978, The Han Maps and Early Chinese Cartography. Annals of the Association of American Geographers, 68(1): 45-60.

External links 

 Gary Tod, "Mawangdui Han tombs" 
 "A Selection of Artifacts," Archeology 
 马王堆汉墓陈列全景数字展厅—湖湖南省博物馆 (Virtual tour of the Mawangdui Han Tombs exhibit at the Hunan Provincial Museum).

Archaeological sites in China
History of Changsha
Buildings and structures in Hunan
Han dynasty architecture
1972 archaeological discoveries